Ludwig Pastor, later Ludwig von Pastor, Freiherr von Campersfelden (31 January 1854 – 30 September 1928), was a German historian and a diplomat for Austria. He became one of the most important Roman Catholic historians of his time and is most notable for his History of the Popes. He was raised to the nobility by the Emperor Franz Joseph I in 1908. He was nominated for the Nobel Prize in Literature six times.

Early life
Born in Aachen, Pastor attended a Frankfurt gymnasium, where his teacher was Johannes Janssen. Born to a Lutheran father and a Catholic mother, Pastor was converted to Catholicism at ten, after his father's death.

Pastor studied in 1875 at Leuven, in 1875/76 at Bonn, where he became a member of the student corporation Arminia, and in 1877/78 at Vienna. Pastor taught at the University of Innsbruck, first as a lecturer (1881–87), then as professor of modern history (1887). His dissertation was titled "Die kirchlichen Reunionsbestrebungen während der Regierung Karls V" (The Church's Attempts at Reunion During the Reign of Charles V). Pastor edited his mentor Janssen's eight-volume Geschichte des deutschen Volkes (History of the German People) and published it from 1893 to 1926.

History of the Popes
Janssen had made him aware of Leopold von Ranke's History of the Popes. This determined the field he would take for his own, becoming in a sense a Catholic anti-Ranke. His approach was that the apparent shortcomings of the Papacy have reflected flaws of their times. Pastor consulted archives throughout Catholic Europe and, during his first trip to Italy in 1881, his seriousness ensured the patronage of Pope Leo XIII, who opened to him the contents of the Vatican Library, which had previously been held unavailable to scholars.

The result of his research was his Geschichte der Päpste seit dem Ausgang des Mittelalters in sixteen volumes. The opus magnum was subsequently translated into English and published as History of the Popes From the Close of the Middle Ages.

Pastor decided to begin his work with the papacy of Pope Clement V (1305–1314) and the onset of the Avignon Papacy, so that he could concentrate his research on surviving documents. His dispassionate and frank papal history concentrated on individual popes rather than on the developments of papal institutions. Pastor's tomes span the pontificates of 56 popes, from Clement V to Pius VI.

He combined the Roman Catholic sympathies necessary for dealing with such a life's work with painstaking scholarship and erudition. He was granted privileged access to the Secret Vatican Archives, and his history, largely based on hitherto unavailable original documents, superseded all previous histories of the popes in the period he covered, which runs from the Avignon Papacy of 1305 to Napoleon's entrance in Rome, 1799.
  
Pastor began his work in 1886 and wrote throughout the pontificates of Leo XIII, Pius X, Benedict XV and Pius XI, publishing fifteen volumes. The 16th and final volume was published posthumously in 1930. The English translations were published between 1899 and 1953.

Academic memberships, honours and offices
In 1901, Pastor was appointed director of the Austrian Historical Institute in Rome, which he headed (with an interruption 1914-1919) until his death.

He also was a member of the Emperor Franz-Joseph Academy in Prague, corresponding member of the Società Colombaria in Florence, member of the Papal Academy in Rome, of the Academy of Cracow and the Académie Royale d´Archéologie de Belgique in Antwerp. He achieved an honorary membership of the Academy of St Luke in Rome, an honorary doctorate at the University of Leuven, and membership in the historical section of the Görres Society.

He received the positions of Commander of the Papal Order of St Sylvester Pope and Martyr, of Knight of the Papal Order of Saint Pius IX, of Commander of the Austrian Order of Franz Joseph and of the Royal Italian Order of Saints Maurice and Lazarus.

Emperor Francis Joseph I elevated him to the nobility in 1908 and gave him the title Freiherr von Campersfelden in 1916. In 1921 he was appointed the Republic of Austria's ambassador to the Holy See, and died in Innsbruck in 1928.

Works
All forty volumes of The History of the Popes are available from the Internet archive. Volumes I to VI are translated and edited by Frederick Ignatius Antrobus, volumes VII to XXIV by Ralph Francis Kerr, volumes XXV to XXXIV by Ernest Graf and volumes XXXV to LX by E. F. Peeler. The publishers vary and include, K. Paul, Trench Trübner, & Co., Routledge and K. Paul.

 Vol. I, 1305–1447, Popes at Avignon, The Schism, Councils of Pisa and Constance, Martin V and Eugenius IV
 Vol. II, 1447–1458, Nicholas V and Calixtus III
 Vol. III, 1447–1464, Pius II
 Vol. IV, 1464–1483, Paul II and Sixtus IV
 Vol. V, 1484–1497, Innocent VIII and Alexander VI
 Vol. VI, 1492–1511, Alexander VI, Pius III and Julius II
 Vol. VII, 1513–1521, Leo X (Book I)
 Vol. VIII, 1513–1521, Leo X (Book II)
 Vol. IX, 1522–1527, Adrian VI and Clement VII
 Vol. X, 1523–1534, Clement VII
 Vol. XI, 1534–1540, Paul III
 Vol. XII, 1534–1549, Paul III
 Vol. XIII, 1550–1555, Julius III
 Vol. XIV, 1555–1559, Marcellus II and Paul IV 
 Vol. XV, 1559–1565, Pius IV
 Vol. XVI, 1559–1565, Pius IV
 Vol. XVII, 1566–1572, Pius V
 Vol. XVIII, 1566–1572, Pius V
 Vol. XIX, 1572–1585, Gregory XIII
 Vol. XX, 1572–1585, Gregory XIII
Vol. XXI, 1585–1590, Sixtus V
Vol. XXII, 1585–1591, Sixtus V, Urban VII, Gregory XIV and Innocent IX
Vol. XXIII, 1592–1605, Clement VIII
Vol. XXIV, 1592–1605, Clement VIII
Vol. XXV, 1605–1621, Leo XI and Paul V
Vol. XXVI, 1605–1621, Leo XI and Paul V
Vol. XXVII, 1621–1644, Gregory XV and Urban VIII
Vol. XXVIII, 1621–1644, Gregory XV and Urban VIII
Vol. XXIX, 1621–1644, Gregory XV and Urban VIII
Vol. XXX, 1644–1655, Innocent X
Vol. XXXI, 1655–1676, Alexander VII, Clement IX and Clement X
Vol. XXXII, 1676–1700, Innocent XI, Alexander VIII and Innocent XII
Vol. XXXIII, 1700–1721, Clement XI
Vol. XXXIV, 1721–1740, Innocent XIII, Benedict XIII and Clement XII
Vol. XXXV, 1740–1758, Benedict XIV
Vol. XXXVI, 1740–1769, Benedict XIV and Clement XIII
Vol. XXXVII, 1758–1769, Clement XIII
Vol. XXXVIII, 1769–1774, Clement XIV
Vol. XXXIX, 1775–1799, Pius VI
Vol. XL, 1775–1799, Pius VI

References

Sources

External links

Pastor @ New Catholic Dictionary
Ludwig Pastor, the Great German Historian: Catholic world, Volume 67, Issue: 397, Apr 1898 @ the University of Michigan

1854 births
1928 deaths
Converts to Roman Catholicism from Lutheranism
20th-century German historians
Historians of the Catholic Church
Austrian diplomats
Barons of Austria
People from Aachen
People from the Rhine Province
University of Bonn alumni
University of Vienna alumni
Academic staff of the University of Innsbruck
German Roman Catholics
Pope Leo XIII
Commanders of the Order of Franz Joseph
Commanders of the Order of Saints Maurice and Lazarus
Knights of the Order of St. Sylvester
Knights of the Order of Pope Pius IX
German male non-fiction writers
19th-century German historians